Alexey Alexandrovich Vitsenko (born 20 April 1990) is a Russian cross-country skier who competes internationally.
 
He participated at the 2018 Winter Olympics.

References

1990 births
Living people
Sportspeople from the Komi Republic
Russian male cross-country skiers
Cross-country skiers at the 2018 Winter Olympics
Tour de Ski skiers
Olympic cross-country skiers of Russia